Comandante Gustavo Kraemer International Airport  is the airport serving Bagé, Brazil. It is named after Captain Gustavo Kraemer, founder and pilot of the airline SAVAG, killed on an air-crash in 1950.

It is operated by CCR.

History
The airport opened on July 5, 1946. On February 8, 1952 the airport was renamed after Gustavo Kraemer, who on June 20, 1950 died on an air-crash while piloting an aircraft of SAVAG, an airline of which he was also president.

Previously operated by Infraero, on April 7, 2021 CCR won a 30-year concession to operate the airport.

Airlines and destinations

Statistics

Accidents and incidents
7 April 1957: a Varig Curtiss C-46A-45-CU Commando registration PP-VCF operating a flight from Bagé to Porto Alegre crashed during take-off from Bagé following a fire developed in the left main gear wheel well and consequent technical difficulties. All 40 passenger and crew died.

Access

See also

List of airports in Brazil

References

External links

Airports in Rio Grande do Sul
Airports established in 1946